The Cut Meutia is a passenger train service currently operating in North Aceh Regency, Aceh, Indonesia. It was opened in 2016 and currently serves just three railway stations in the regency, with plans for extension to three other stations. It is the only active train service in Indonesia which runs on the 1,435 mm standard gauge, and the only operational train service in Aceh.

History
Railways had been operational in Aceh since the Dutch East Indies era, linking Banda Aceh to Langkat in North Sumatra. The line ceased operations in 1982, however, leaving Aceh without operational train services and existing stations and railways deteriorating. In 1996, an attempt to develop tracks between Langkat and Aceh's provincial border ceased due to funding difficulties after laying 2 kilometers of track. Another section measuring 5 kilometers were developed in 2000, but again development ceased due to lack of funds.

In 2002, an agreement was struck between governors in Sumatra to redevelop a Trans-Sumatran railway network, which would once more link Aceh to other cities in the island. Following the 2004 earthquake and tsunami, reconstruction aid from France was delivered through SNCF; this included the development of an  stretch of railway track which followed the 1,435 mm standard gauge instead of the 1,067 mm gauge used elsewhere in Indonesia. Trial runs began on 1 December 2013, with tracks from  near Bireuën to Krueng Geukueh near Lhokseumawe via Bungkaih. Due to lack of passenger demand, the trial was halted by July 2014.

On 3 November 2016, the service was reopened and given the name Cut Meutia after the national hero Cut Nyak Meutia. Kereta Api Indonesia operates the service. As of 2023, it is classified as a "pioneer" service, one of five operational in Indonesia at the time. It is currently the only operational stretch of railway within the province, and the only one in the country running on the 1,435 mm gauge.

Future extensions
Development is underway on a  extension of the service to the completed stations of Kutablang and Geurugok in Bireuën Regency. Another  extension to Paloh is in its planning stage. In context of the development of the full Trans-Sumatra system, the 1,435 mm track is planned to meet the national 1,067 mm track at Kutablang, and the planned development of the 1,435 mm railway will be limited to the Kutablang - Lhokseumawe route separate from the main line.

Rolling stock and service
The train has two cars and a capacity of 192 passengers, and the whole trip lasts for 32 minutes. The diesel rolling stock was manufactured by PT INKA. 

As of 2022, the fare for the train is set at Rp 2,000, with multiple daily services in the morning and afternoon. Due to its low fare and short travel distance, it is commonly used by locals as a recreational vehicle, especially by schoolchildren. The service is currently subsidized by the Indonesian government, receiving Rp 18.8 billion (~USD 1.2 million) in 2021. The service reported 32,936 riders throughout 2022.

References

Transport in Aceh
Regional rail in Indonesia
Railway services introduced in 2016
Named passenger trains